"I Would" is a song written and recorded by American country music artist Phil Vassar.  It was released in July 2008 as the third single from the album Prayer of a Common Man.  The song reached #26 on the Billboard Hot Country Songs chart.

Chart performance

References

2008 singles
2008 songs
Country ballads
2000s ballads
Phil Vassar songs
Songs written by Phil Vassar
Song recordings produced by Mark Wright (record producer)
Show Dog-Universal Music singles